The following lists events that happened during 1962 in the Republic of India.

Incumbents
 President of India – until 13 May, Sarvepalli Radhakrishnan
 Prime Minister of India – Jawaharlal Nehru
 Chief Justice of India – Bhuvaneshwar Prasad Sinha

Governors
 Andhra Pradesh – Bhim Sen Sachar (until 8 September), Satyawant Mallannah Shrinagesh (starting 8 September)
 Assam – Satyavant Mallannah Shrinagesh (until 7 September), Vishnu Sahay (starting 7 September)
 Bihar – Zakir Hussain (until 11 May), M. A. S. Ayyangar (starting 11 May)
 Gujarat – Mehdi Nawaz Jung
 Karnataka – Jayachamarajendra Wadiyar 
 Kerala – V. V. Giri 
 Madhya Pradesh – Hari Vinayak Pataskar
 Maharashtra – 
 until 16 April: Sri Prakasa 
 16 April-6 October: P. Subbarayan 
 starting 28 November: Vijaya Lakshmi Pandit
 Odisha – Yeshwant Narayan Sukthankar (until 15 September), Ajudhia Nath Khosla (starting 15 September) 
 Punjab – Narahar Vishnu Gadgil (until 1 October), Pattom A. Thanu Pillai (starting 1 October)
 Rajasthan – Gurumukh Nihal Singh (until 16 April), Sampurnanand (starting 16 April)
 Uttar Pradesh – Burgula Ramakrishna Rao (until 15 April), Bishwanath Das (starting 15 April)
 West Bengal – Padmaja Naidu

Events
 National income - 200,769 million
 10 February - Indian National Committee for Space Research set up with Vikram Sarabhai from Physical Research Laboratory leading it.
 3 April – Jawaharlal Nehru is elected de facto Prime Minister of India.
 6 May – India defeats the Philippines in the Eastern Zone final of 1962 Davis Cup at New Delhi
 28 July – A locust swarm threatens New Delhi.
 21 September – A border conflict between China and India erupts into fighting.
 10 October – Beginning of the Sino-Indian War, a border dispute involving two of the world's largest nations (between India and the People's Republic of China).
 20 October – Chinese troops invade Kashmir and illegally captured Aksai Chin thereby starting the Sino-Indian War.
 26 October - Emergency enforced in India for the first time following the Sino-Indian War.
 21 November – China withdraws troops from Arunachal Pradesh and orders ceasefire along the McMahon Line.
 19 December – The last foreign-occupied territory of India, Daman and Diu, is integrated into India.
 Internment of Chinese-Indians at Deoli, Rajasthan

Law
 28 October – Defence of India act and Defence of India rules, 1962 promulgated as ordinance. 
 The twelfth and Thirteenth Amendment of The Constitution of India

Births
17 January – Karan Kapoor, actor, model and photographer.
12 February  Jagapathi Babu, actor.
17 March  Kalpana Chawla, Indian-American Astronaut and First Indian women to go to space. (died 2003).
3 April – Jaya Prada, actress and politician.
7 April – Ram Gopal Varma, film director, writer and producer.
13 May – Acharya Shri Mahashraman, 11th Acharya of Jain Terapanth Sect
27 May – Ravi Shastri, cricketer.
5 June – C. Sylendra Babu, Indian Police Service Officer.
9 June – N. K. Senthamarai Kannan, Indian Police Service Officer.
3 July – U. Sagayam, former career Indian civil servant 
6 July – Thota Narasimham, Indian politician and member of parliament from Kakinada.
12 July  Shiva Rajkumar, actor and producer.
15 August  Arjun Sarja, actor, producer and director. 
21 August  Raadhika Sarathkumar, actress and producer.
25 August – Rajiv Kapoor, actor, producer and director. (d. 2021)
4 September – Kiran More, cricketer.
16 November  Ambika, actress.

Full date unknown
Sucheta Dalal, finance journalist.
Madhavi, actress.

Deaths
11 June – Chhabi Biswas, actor (b. 1900).
1 July – Bidhan Chandra Roy, second Chief Minister of West Bengal (b. 1882).
 4 December – Annapurnanand, Hindi writer (B 21 Sep. 1895)

Full date unknown
K. C. Dey, actor (b. 1893).

See also 
 List of Bollywood films of 1962

References

 
India
Years of the 20th century in India
1960s in India
India